Aleksandr Sergeyevich Sheshukov (born 15 April 1983) is a Russian former footballer who played as a midfielder or defender.

International career
Sheshukov made his debut for the Russia national football team on 7 June 2011 in a friendly against Cameroon.

Career statistics

Honours
Lokomotiv Moscow
Russian Cup: 2014–15

External links
  Player page on the official FC Moscow website
 

1983 births
Sportspeople from Omsk
Living people
Russian footballers
Russia youth international footballers
Russia under-21 international footballers
Association football midfielders
FC Spartak Tambov players
FC Spartak Moscow players
FC Luch Vladivostok players
FC Moscow players
FC Sokol Saratov players
FC Rostov players
FC Lokomotiv Moscow players
Russian Premier League players
FC Arsenal Tula players
FC Baltika Kaliningrad players
Russia international footballers
FC Znamya Truda Orekhovo-Zuyevo players